Robert Pailor (7 July 1887 – 24 January 1976), was an English footballer who played as a centre-forward.

Biography
Pailor was born in Stockton-on-Tees. He turned professional with West Bromwich Albion in October 1908, making his debut in January 1909 in a Division Two match against Bradford Park Avenue. In May 1914 he joined Newcastle United for a £1,550 fee, but retired from football just twelve months later due to a kidney complaint. He died in Hartlepool in 1976.

Sources
 

1887 births
1976 deaths
Footballers from Stockton-on-Tees
Footballers from County Durham
English footballers
Association football forwards
West Bromwich Albion F.C. players
Newcastle United F.C. players
FA Cup Final players